Jean Paulhan (2 December 1884 – 9 October 1968) was a French writer, literary critic and publisher, director of the literary magazine Nouvelle Revue Française (NRF) from 1925 to 1940 and from 1946 to 1968. He was a member (Seat 6, 1963–68) of the Académie française. He was born in Nîmes (Gard) and died in Paris.

Biography 
Paulhan's father was the philosopher Frédéric Paulhan:11 and his mother was Jeanne Thérond. From 1908 to 1910 he worked as a teacher in Madagascar, and he later translated Malagasy poems, or Hainteny, into French.

Paulhan's translations attracted the interest of Guillaume Apollinaire and Paul Éluard.

He served as Jacques Rivière's secretary at the NRF, until 1925 when he succeeded him as the journal's editor.:13 In 1935 he, Henri Michaux, Giuseppe Ungaretti, Groethuysen and others launched a similar but more luxuriously-produced journal Mesures, under the direction of Henry Church.

One of his most famous works of literary criticism was The Flowers of Tarbes, or Terror in Literature (1941), a study of the nature of language  in fiction. Paulhan also wrote several autobiographical short stories; English translations of several appeared in the collection Progress in Love on the Slow Side. During the Second World War, Paulhan was an early and active member of the French Resistance and was arrested by the German Gestapo. After the war he founded Cahiers de la Pléiade and in 1953 re-launched La Nouvelle Revue Française.

Paulhan provoked controversy by opposing independence for Algeria, and supporting the French military during the Algerian War; this resulted in a rift between Paulhan and his friend Maurice Blanchot.

Author Anne Desclos revealed that she had written the novel Story of O as a series of love letters to her lover Paulhan, who had admired the work of the Marquis de Sade.

Works
Les Hain-Tenys Merinas (Geuthner, 1913, reissued 2007)
Le Guerrier appliqué (Sansot, 1917 ; Gallimard 1930, reissued 2006)
Jacob Cow le Pirate, ou Si les mots sont des signes (1921)
Le Pont traversé (1921, reissued 2006)
Expérience du proverbe (1925)
La Guérison sévère (1925, reissued 2006)
Sur un défaut de la pensée critique (1929)
Les Hain-Tenys, poésie obscure (1930)
Entretien sur des faits-divers (1930, 1945)
L'Aveuglette (1952)
Les Fleurs de Tarbes ou La terreur dans les Lettres (1936, 1941)
Jacques Decour (1943)
Aytre qui perd l'habitude (1920, 1943, reissued 2006)
Clef de la poésie, qui permet de distinguer le vrai du faux en toute observation, ou Doctrine touchant la rime, le rythme, le vers, le poète et la poésie (1945)
F.F. ou Le Critique (Gallimard, 1945; reissued by Éditions Claire Paulhan, 1998)
Sept causes célèbres (1946)
La Métromanie, ou Les dessous de la capitale (1946, reissued 2006)
Braque le Patron (1946)
Lettre aux membres du C.N.E. (1940)
Sept nouvelles causes célèbres (1947, reissued 2006)
Guide d'un petit voyage en Suisse (1947, reissued 2006)
Dernière lettre (1947)
Le Berger d’Écosse (1948, reissued 2006)
Fautrier l'Enragé (1949)
Petit-Livre-à-déchirer (1949)
Trois causes célèbres (1950)
Les Causes célèbres (1950, reissued 2006)
Lettre au médecin (1950, reissued 2006)
Les Gardiens (1951, reissued 2006)
Le Marquis de Sade et sa complice ou Les revanches de la Pudeur (1951)
Petite préface à toute critique  (1951)
Lettre aux directeurs de la Résistance (1952)
La Preuve par l'étymologie (1953)
Les Paroles transparentes, avec des lithographies de Georges Braque (1955)
Le Clair et l'Obscur (1958)
G. Braque (1958)
De mauvais sujets, gravures de Marc Chagall (1958, reissued 2006)
Karskaya (1959)
Lettres (1961)
L'Art informel (1962)
Fautrier l'enragé (1962)
Progrès en amour assez lents (1966, reissued 2006)
Choix de lettres I 1917–1936, La littérature est une fête" (1986)
"Choix de lettres II 1937-1945, Traité des jours sombres" (1992)Choix de lettres III 1946-1968, Le Don des langues (1996)La Vie est pleine de choses redoutables (Seghers; reissued by Claire Paulhan, 1990)
"Lettres de Madagascar, 1907-1910", Éditions Claire Paulhan (2007)
"Œuvres complètes", edited by Bernard Baillaud, Volume I, Gallimard (2006).

 References 

Further reading
 Michael Syrotinski, Defying Gravity: Jean Paulhan's Interventions in Twentieth-Century French Intellectual History (SUNY Press, 1998).
 Anna-Louise Milne, The Extreme In-Between: Jean Paulhan's Place in the Twentieth Century (Oxford: Legenda, 2006)
 Jean Paulhan, On Poetry and Politics''. Translated by Jennifer Bajorek, Eric Trudel and Charlotte Mandell (University of Illinois Press, 2008).
 "Protean, Paradoxical Jean Paulhan", by John Taylor, 'Paths to Contemporary French Literature', volume 2, New Brunswick, New Jersey: Transaction Publishers, 2007, pp. 237–240.

External links 
  Les Lettres Françaises 
  France Culture, Alain Veinstein reçoit Bernard Baillaud

1884 births
1968 deaths
People from Nîmes
French literary critics
French military personnel of World War I
Grand Officiers of the Légion d'honneur
Burials at the Cimetière parisien de Bagneux
Members of the Académie Française
French male non-fiction writers
20th-century French male writers
Nouvelle Revue Française editors
French Resistance members